Menogeia (or ) is a village in the Larnaca District of Cyprus, located 2 km west of Anglisides. In 2011, it had a population of 50.

Menogeia was a mixed Greek- and Turkish-Cypriot village until 1946. Between 1960 and 1974, it was inhabited exclusively by Turkish Cypriots. Following the Turkish invasion in 1974, they were all displaced; most settled in Spathariko in the north.

References

Communities in Larnaca District